Howard Edwin Armstrong (April 19, 1903 – October 7, 1983) was a public official in Vermont who served as Secretary of State for sixteen years.

Biography
Armstrong was born in Bennington, Vermont on April 19, 1903, the son of Marcus P. Armstrong (1864-1928) and Alice J. Cordes (1868-1953).  He graduated from Bennington High School in 1922, and attended the University of Vermont from 1922 to 1923.  He decided on a legal career, and studied law with Harry Chase of Bennington, and in the Ludlow office of William W. Stickney and John G. Sargent.  Armstrong was admitted to the bar in 1926.

A Republican, Armstrong served as second assistant clerk of the Vermont House of Representatives in  1925, and was the House Clerk from 1927 to 1933.  He was Secretary of Civil and Military Affairs (chief assistant) to Governor Charles Manley Smith in 1935.  Armstrong served as the state Commissioner of Industries from 1936 to 1939, and Commissioner of Industrial Relations from 1939 to 1949.

In 1948, Armstrong was the successful Republican nominee for Secretary of State.  He was reelected seven times, and served from January 1949 to January 1965.  Armstrong was defeated by Harry H. Cooley during the Democratic landslide of 1964, which was the first time a Democrat had ever won the Secretary of State's office.

In 1968, Republican Richard C. Thomas won the Secretary of State's position.  He employed former Secretaries Armstrong and Helen E. Burbank on a consulting basis at the start of his eight-year tenure.

Retirement
In retirement, Armstrong resided in Montpelier.  He died at his home on October 7, 1983; he was being treated for cancer, and his death was caused by a self-inflicted gunshot wound.  He was buried at Plymouth Notch Cemetery in Plymouth Notch, Vermont.

Family
In 1929, Armstrong married Margaret Ellen Brown (1907-1996).  They were the parents of a son, Cordes V. Armstrong, (1935-2000).

References

Sources

Newspapers

Books

Internet

1903 births
1983 deaths
People from Bennington, Vermont
People from Montpelier, Vermont
Vermont lawyers
Vermont Republicans
Secretaries of State of Vermont
Burials in Vermont
20th-century American lawyers
Suicides by firearm in Vermont